Gran Paradiso is the fourth studio album by Waldeck, released in 2016. Gran Paradiso was co-written by Viennese singer Heidi Moussa-Benamma (la Heidi), who is featured on eight of the thirteen tracks. The album combines elements of trip hop, downtempo, and reggae. It is Waldeck's first major release since 2007's Ballroom Stories.

Track listing

Personnel

La Heidi – vocals, composer
Klaus Waldeck – performer, producer, composer
Milos Todorovski – accordion
Martin Heinzle – bass
P. Mossbrugger – bass
Rüdiger Kostron – bass
Hermann Aigner – drums
Shayan Fathi – drums
Buerowinkler – graphics
Thomas Hechenberger – guitar
Christian Santera – harmonica
Funky Horn Brothers – horns
Albin Paulus – Jew's Harp
Gerald Selig – saxophone
Clemens Hofer – trombone
Joschi Ötti – trumpet
Josef Fuchsberger – trumpet
Dorothee Badent – violin, viola

References 

2016 albums
Klaus Waldeck albums